Joseph Towles (August 17, 1937 – December 19, 1988) was an African American anthropologist and author of the books Nkumbi Initiation and Asa: Myth of Origin of the Blood Brotherhood Among the Mbo of the Ituri Forest. Towles was born in Senora, Virginia, to Arcellius Towles and Lucy Blair and was raised in Virginia before moving to New York City to pursue acting. He graduated with an undergraduate degree in anthropology from Pace University, and received a Ph.D. from Makerere University in Uganda.

Career 
Towles was a volunteer in the Anthropology department at the American Museum of Natural History, where he assisted in the creation of the "Man in Africa Hall," later called the "Hall of African Peoples" from 1965 to 1967. Towles is credited with developing sections of the exhibit on African American enslavement, the African experience in the Americas, and Egyptian history. According to In the Arms of Africa, Towles' work on "Man in Africa Hall" gave the exhibit greater staying power by including Egypt, which was typically included in Middle Eastern studies rather than African studies at the time. The exhibit was one of the first in the United States to situate the study of Egypt within Africa rather than the Middle East. Towles also researched and constructed the "Slavery in the New World" section of the museum.

Turnbull and Towles spent time in Africa conducting anthropological fieldwork with the Ik, Mbuti, and Mbo peoples.

Personal life 
Towles met British anthropologist Colin Turnbull in 1959 while living in New York. They were married in 1960 and lived together until Towles' death of AIDS in 1988. In 1967, Turnbull and Towles built an estate in Lancaster county, Virginia, called Chestnut Point.

External links 

 Inventory of Joseph A. Towles Papers, circa 1920s-2009, Avery Research Center for African American History and Culture

References 

African-American scientists
1937 births
1988 deaths
20th-century American anthropologists
LGBT people from Virginia
AIDS-related deaths in the United States
American LGBT scientists
LGBT African Americans
AIDS-related deaths in Virginia
20th-century African-American people
20th-century American LGBT people